Zanthoxylum rhoifolium is a species of tree in the family Rutaceae known by the common names mamica de cadela, tambataru, and prickly ash. It is native to South America. It is a common tree on the Cerrado.

Description
This species is a deciduous tree reaching up to 12 meters in height. It produces a spherical black capsule about half a centimeter in length and width containing small, hard-coated seeds.

Ecology
The tree is not shade tolerant, so it can be found in open areas in and around forests.

Uses
This is a medicinal plant. The bark is used to treat toothache and earache. It is used as an anti-inflammatory. It is used to treat malaria. Parts of the plant also have antibacterial and fungicidal action.

Chemical compounds
It contains nitidine, an alkaloid with anti-malarial action. It is of commercial value as a component of herbal remedies for malaria.

References

rhoifolium
Flora of the Cerrado
Taxa named by Jean-Baptiste Lamarck
Trees of Brazil
Trees of Peru